The Leiden American Pilgrim Museum is a small museum in the Dutch city of Leiden dedicated to the Pilgrim Fathers (or simply Pilgrims). These Separatists or English Dissenters were religious refugees who had fled England to Amsterdam in 1608 and moved to Leiden the next year. They lived and worked in that city for about 12 to 20 years. In 1620, their emigration began. They left Leiden by canal, going to Delfshaven where they embarked on the Speedwell, which took them to Southampton. But the Speedwell proved leaky and had to be sold, so they transferred to the Mayflower. The Mayflower undertook the famous voyage to New England in 1620 alone. In the 19th century the colonists' first harvest festival after their arrival at Plymouth Colony was identified as the origin of the annual Thanksgiving celebration in the United States.

Description
The Leiden American Pilgrim Museum is housed in a building dating to about 1365–1370. The house is located at Beschuitsteeg 9, next to the bell tower of the Hooglandse Kerk church. The museum is operated by the Leiden American Pilgrim Museum Foundation and is open to the public.

The museum presents extensive information about Pilgrim life in Leiden, together with the history of the medieval house itself. In the museum, a collection of furniture, books, and other material from Pilgrim times illuminates the lives of these people in England, Leiden, and New England. The museum illustrates its Pilgrim narrative with a collection of 16th- and 17th-century maps and engravings by Gerard Mercator, Adriaen Pietersz. van de Venne, and others. Additionally, one room of the museum retains its interior from the 14th century and is furnished with pre-Reformation material, reflecting the original use of the house as a residence of priests from the Hooglandsekerk across the street.

In 2009, the 400-year anniversary of the Pilgrims' arrival in Leiden was marked with an exhibition and the publication of the book Strangers and Pilgrims, Travellers and Sojourners - Leiden and the Foundations of Plymouth Plantation. In 2011 the museum coordinated efforts to install a bronze memorial on the ruins of Leiden's Vrouwekerk, commemorating the history of the church and its connections with colonists of Plymouth Colony and New Netherland. The museum has published several books since then, including Plymouth Colony's Private Libraries (rev.ed. 2018). Two books mark 2020: New Light on the Old Colony - Plymouth, the Dutch Context of Toleration, and Patterns of Pilgrim Commemoration (Brill); and Intellectual Baggage - The Pilgrims and Plymouth Colony, Ideas of Influence (LAPM, available from Lulu Publishing).

Other museums 
The regional archives of Leiden (Regionaal Archief Leiden) maintains a special website section on the Pilgrims under the name Pilgrim Archives Leiden. In Plymouth, Massachusetts, two other museums are dedicated to the Pilgrims, Plimoth Plantation and the Pilgrim Hall Museum.

See also
 Pieterskerk, Leiden

References

External links

 Website of the Leiden American Pilgrim Museum
 Pilgrim Archives Leiden

Museums in Leiden
History museums in the Netherlands